Ankuram is a 1993 Telugu-language drama film written and directed by C. Umamaheswara Rao. It stars Revathi, Sarath Babu and Om Puri. The film is about an inspiring journey of a middle-class woman to return an abandoned child to his father. Ankuram runs, in the background, issues like social stigmas, feudalism, naxalism, bureaucracy and human rights. The film was premiered at the 1993 International Film Festival of India in the mainstream section.

The plot unfolds like a Chinese puzzle; it's a journey where we discover gradually the reason for the lead being harassed by the police, the blocks she faces uncovering a father's identity, and the darker side of an authoritarian police force and its brutality towards tribals. The film has received the National Film Award for Best Feature Film in Telugu for that year.

Plot
The movie starts with the marriage of a young couple. The bride Sindhura (Revathy) finds a child on a train. She wants to support the child, against the wishes of her husband's family, until she locates the child's parents.

She starts enquiring about the passenger who left his child on the train. Satyam (Om Puri), father of the child, has been on the chase by feudals and police. The police are unable to find him and arrest his pregnant wife. Tribals protested and planned to attack the police. They were stopped by Dr. Mitra (Charuhasan), a pro-tribal doctor. A sadistic officer forced the mother to do situps, resulting in loss of her life. Angered crowd killed the police officer, which caused more violence between officials and tribals.

During the course of the search, Sindhura is implicated in a false case and loses her married life. She faces the threats by rowdies to her own parents and sisters. She persists with the help of Rao (Sarat Babu) (a civil liberty activist and lawyer), goes to the village, brings the atrocities towards the oppressed people to light, and returns the child.

Ankuram ends with the message that citizens who can speak have the responsibility of speaking about the rights of the fellow citizens who can not speak.

Awards
National Film Awards
National Film Award for Best Feature Film in Telugu (1992) - (director) - C. Umamaheswara Rao (1992)

Nandi Awards
Nandi Award for Best Director - C. Umamaheswara Rao.

Filmfare Awards South
Filmfare Award for Best Actress - Telugu - Revathi (1992)

Cast
 Revathy as Sindhura
 Sarath Babu as Lawyer Vishwanatha Rao
 Om Puri as Satyam
 M. Balaiah as Sindhura's father
 Kota Sankararao as Police officer
 Charuhasan as Mitra
 Hari Prasad as Sindhura's husband
 P. L. Narayana
 Raasi as Sindhura's sister
 Sai Chand
 Raja Ravindra as Photographer
 Ali as Veera Babu

Crew
 Story, Screenplay & Direction: Umamaheswara Rao. C
 Production: K. V. Suresh Kumar from Film India Art Creations
 Music: Hamsalekha
 Camera: Madhu Ambat
 Lyrics: Sirivennela
 Playback: S. P. Balasubrahmanyam and Chitra

Soundtrack
The soundtrack features one popular track "Evaro okaru epudo apudu nadavara mundhuga" with lyrics by Sirivennela and voice by playback singers S. P. Balasubrahmanyam and Chitra. The theme of the song is that the first person walking towards a new goal is always alone at first and then others follow.

The film has one comic song "Athaarintiki Railekkindhi rubber bomma" which was shot in the train while Revathy was traveling. It also has another song "Hai guru! Chelaregaro selavulochhayani" picturized on college students.

References

1993 films
1990s Telugu-language films
Films scored by Hamsalekha
Indian feudalism
Best Telugu Feature Film National Film Award winners

te:అంకురం (సినిమా)